Jorge Ferrío Luque (born 24 August 1976 in Madrid) is a Spanish former cyclist.

Major results

2004
 1st Clásica a los Puertos de Guadarrama
 1st Mountains classification Vuelta a la Rioja
 6th Trofeo Luis Puig
 8th Overall Escalada a Montjuïc
 8th Overall Vuelta a Aragón
 8th Gran Premio Miguel Induráin
 10th Overall 2004 Tour of the Basque Country
2005
 1st Stage 2 Vuelta a La Rioja
 1st Stage 5 Volta a Portugal
 2nd GP Llodio
 5th Overall Troféu Joaquim Agostinho
 6th Overall Vuelta a Castilla y León
 8th Klasika Primavera
 8th Overall Setmana Catalana de Ciclisme
 10th Overall Vuelta Asturias
2006
 7th Overall Clásica Internacional de Alcobendas
2007
 8th Trofeo Sóller
 9th Overall Vuelta Asturias

References

1976 births
Living people
Spanish male cyclists
Cyclists from Madrid